The Gendarmerie Nationale and the Police Nationale are the national police forces of Chad.

Historical secret police organizations
 Direction de la Documentation et de la Sécurité (DDS) (Directorate of Documentation and Security)

Secret police organizations
 Agence nationale de sécurité (ANS) (National Security Agency)

Sources
 World Police Encyclopedia, ed. by Dilip K. Das & Michael Palmiotto published by Taylor & Francis. 2004,
 World Encyclopedia of Police Forces and Correctional Systems, second edition, 2006 by Gale.
 Sullivan, Larry E. Encyclopedia of Law Enforcement. Thousand Oaks: Sage Publications, 2005.

 
Government of Chad